All About Space is a monthly popular science magazine, focusing primarily on cosmological events, astronomical tips, and astronautical exploration.

History and profile
All About Space was first published in June 2012. by the British publisher Imagine Publishing. The first issue was published on 28 June 2012. The magazine was taken over by Future Publishing on 21 October 2016.

Dave Harfield  was the launching editor-in-chief of All About Space, which has regular features on ongoing space missions, as well as having a "future tech" section that details the capabilities of space exploration under future technology. The magazine can be bought in standard print format, or digitally through Zinio, iTunes or Google Play.

Previous publisher Imagine Publishing said that the demographic of the magazine is 80% male and 20% female. The average age group is 22-45 and the readers are affluent.

References

External links
 Official website

2012 establishments in the United Kingdom
Astronomy magazines
Magazines established in 2012
Monthly magazines published in the United Kingdom
Science and technology magazines published in the United Kingdom